Andy Runton is an American writer and artist. He is the creator of the graphic novel series Owly, first published in 2005 by Top Shelf. Before he worked on Owly Runton was a graphic designer. In 2005, he won the Ignatz Award for Promising New Talent. His work was also nominated for "Best Publication for a Younger Audience" at the Eisner Awards the same year, which he won in 2006.

References

External links
 
 Who, Who is Andy Runton?, Comic Foundry
 Owly Live Journal

Living people
American graphic novelists
Georgia Tech alumni
Place of birth missing (living people)
Year of birth missing (living people)
Harvey Award winners for Best New Talent
Ignatz Award winners
American male novelists